C43, C-43 or C.43 may refer to:
 Alfa Romeo C43, Formula One car
 Beech C-43 Traveler, an American biplane
 Bill C-43, several bills of the Parliament of Canada
 C43 road (Namibia)
 C43 torpedo, a Chinese torpedo
 Caldwell 43, a spiral galaxy
 Caudron C.43, a French biplane
 Hiram Cure Airfield in Eaton County, Michigan
 Marshall C43, a British bus
 Melanoma
 Mercedes-Benz C43 AMG, an automobile
 Petrov's Defence, a chess opening